The Compañía General de Ferrocarriles en la Provincia de Buenos Aires (CGBA) (in French: "Compagnie générale de chemins de fer dans la Province de Buenos Aires") was a French–owned company, formed in 1904, which operated a metre-gauge railway network in Argentina.

History 
In 1904 the company took over a concession to build lines between the ports of Buenos Aires and Rosario, and to La Plata, together with other branch lines in the west and south of Buenos Aires Province. These lines were built as detailed below:

The company always faced tough competition from the various large British-owned railway companies operating in the Province who had already built lines in those areas where most profit was to be made. As a result of this competition, plans to build a line between Buenos Aires and Bahía Blanca and other branch lines were abandoned.

When the Government of Juan Domingo Perón took over the railways in 1948, the CGBA became part of Ferrocarril Belgrano. In 1961 the Government of Arturo Illia decided to close all the lines that were uneconomic so many branches were closed, such as the CGBA's G3 (to Port of La Plata), G4 (to General Villegas), G5 (to Victorino de la Plaza) and G6 (to Vedia).

Although some branches would be re-opened later, those reopenings were temporal, being the most of them definitely closed in 1977 by the de facto government in power in Argentina by then.

Of those branches, only G remained active but only to González Catán. During the railway privatisation in Argentina in 1992, the line was taken over by Metropolitano, that operated the line until the contract of concession was revoked by the Government of Argentina in 2007. As a result, the Buenos Aires-González Catán branch was operated by the consortium UGOFE until February 2014 when the whole Belgrano Sur Line was re-privatised and given in concession to private company "Argentren" of Emepa Group. UGOFE was therefore dissolved.

Gallery

See also 
Belgrano Sur Line

Notes

References

External links 
Amigos del Ferrocarril Belgrano, a civil association dedicated to recover Ferrocarril Belgrano's tracks and stations

c
c
c
c
c
c
c